Gunnison is a city in the Sevier Valley in southwestern Sanpete County, Utah, United States. The population was 3,509 at the 2020 census. The city was named in honor of John W. Gunnison, a United States Army officer who surveyed for the transcontinental railroad in 1853.

History

2007 gas spill

The gasoline leaked throughout the soil beneath South Main Street and eventually throughout the southwest side of town, contaminating businesses and homes. On August 10, 2007, local and state officials ordered the temporary evacuation of an entire Main Street block, heavily populated with businesses, because of the fumes from the gasoline leak. In the weeks following, Wasatch Environmental installed underground soil-ventilation systems. Several businesses, including the Top Stop, permanently closed, and some homes were evacuated. Gunnison City, along with several businesses and residents, filed suit against Wind River Petroleum over the handling of the gas leak. As of 2010, approximately $3 million ($1 million from a state cleanup fund, $2 million from Wind River Petroleum) had been spent on the cleanup, which is expected to last a decade. Gunnison City recently completed a Main Street rehabilitation project valued at over $1 million.

Geography

Demographics
As of the census of 2000, there were 2,394 people, 513 households, and 410 families residing in the city. The population density was 451.9 people per square mile (174.4/km2). There were 549 housing units at an average density of 103.6 per square mile (40.0/km2). The racial makeup of the city was 88.35% White, 1.84% African American, 2.51% Native American, 0.79% Asian, 0.58% Pacific Islander, 3.97% from other races, and 8.00% from two or more races. Hispanic or Latino of any race were 7.10% of the population.

There were 513 households, out of which 45.2% had children under the age of 18 living with them, 72.1% were married couples living together, 6.4% had a female householder with no husband present, and 19.9% were non-families. 18.7% of all households were made up of individuals, and 12.1% had someone living alone who was 65 years or older. The average household size was 3.12, and the average family size was 3.59.

In the city, the population was spread out, with 25.3% under 18, 13.2% from 18 to 24, 33.8% from 25 to 44, 17.9% from 45 to 64, and 9.7% who were 65 years of age or older. The median age was 32 years. For every 100 females, there were 197.4 males. For every 100 females aged 18 and over, there were 240.6 males. The startling ratio of women to men is due to the presence of the Central Utah Correctional Facility, located one half mile northeast of downtown Gunnison. This state-run prison opened in 1990, has a capacity of 1500 inmates, and currently houses only male offenders.

The median income for a household in the city was $33,147, and the median income for a family was $37,500. Males had a median income of $27,207 versus $23,958 for females. The per capita income for the city was $14,537. About 9.8% of families and 11.0% of the population were below the poverty line, including 12.9% of those under age 18 and 10.9% of those aged 65 or over.

Education
Gunnison is located in the South Sanpete School District and has one elementary school, one middle school, and one high school, Gunnison Valley High School, (all of which are known as Gunnison Valley).

See also

 List of cities and towns in Utah
 Gunnison Valley

References

External links

 

Cities in Utah
Cities in Sanpete County, Utah
Populated places established in 1859
1859 establishments in Utah Territory